Man of the World 2017 was the inaugural edition of the Man of the World competition. It was held on 28 July 2017 at One Esplanade in Pasay, Philippines. Mostafa Galal Mohammed Elezali of Egypt was crowned at the end of the event.

Results

Fast track events

Special awards 

§ Automatic placement in the Top 18

Order Of Announcements

Top 18

 

Top 10

Top 5

Contestants

Notes

Crossover 
Major competitions
 Manhunt International
 2016:  – Mooltribut Phiratthaphong (Top 16)

 Men Universe Model
 2012:  - Daniel José Da Luz Da Graça

 Mister Global
 2014:  - Daniel José Da Luz Da Graça

 Mister International
 2015:  - Christian Hernández
 2016:  - James Carne (Top 16) 
 2016:  - Jung Goo Young

References 

Man of the World (pageant)
2017 beauty pageants
July 2017 events in the Philippines